The third round of AFC matches for the 2022 FIFA World Cup qualification was played from 2 September 2021 to 29 March 2022.

Format
The twelve teams that advanced from the second round (the seven group winners excluding Qatar and the five best group runners-up) were divided into two groups of six teams to play home-and-away round-robin matches. The top two teams of each group qualified for the 2022 FIFA World Cup, and the two third-placed teams advanced to the fourth round. World Cup hosts Qatar won Group E in the second round (which meant they advanced to the 2023 AFC Asian Cup finals) but were not required to qualify for the World Cup.

Qualified teams

Draw and seeding 
The draw for the third round was held on 1 July 2021 at 15:00 MST (UTC+8), in Kuala Lumpur, Malaysia.

The seeding for the draw was based on a special release of the FIFA Men's World Rankings for Asian teams on 18 June 2021 (shown in parentheses below).

Each group contained one team from each of the six pots.

Note: Bolded teams qualified for the World Cup. Italicised teams qualified for the fourth round.

Schedule
Due to the COVID-19 pandemic in Asia, FIFA announced on 12 August 2020 that the upcoming qualifying matches originally scheduled for 2020 were moved to 2021, and on 11 November, the AFC Competitions Committee also announced that the final round of the Asian qualifiers would begin in September 2021 and be finished by March 2022.

Groups

Group A

Group B

Goalscorers

See also
2023 AFC Asian Cup qualification – Third Round

Notes

References

External links

Qualifiers – Asia Matches, FIFA.com
FIFA World Cup, the-AFC.com
FIFA World Cup 2022, stats.the-AFC.com

3
2021 in Asian football
2022 in Asian football
FIFA World Cup qualification, AFC Round 3
FIFA World Cup qualification, AFC Round 3
FIFA World Cup qualification, AFC Round 3
FIFA World Cup qualification, AFC Round 3
FIFA World Cup qualification, AFC Round 3
FIFA World Cup qualification, AFC Round 3
Australia at the 2022 FIFA World Cup
Iran at the 2022 FIFA World Cup
Japan at the 2022 FIFA World Cup
Saudi Arabia at the 2022 FIFA World Cup
South Korea at the 2022 FIFA World Cup